Colobanthus is a large genus of small, cushion-like herbaceous plants in the family Caryophyllaceae, sometimes known as "pearlworts", a name they share with plants of the related genus Sagina. C. quitensis is the world's southernmost dicot, and one of only two native extant flowering plants of Antarctica.

Selected species
 Colobanthus acicularis Hook. f.
 Colobanthus affinis (Hook) Hook. f.
 Colobanthus apetalus (Labill.) Druce synonym = Spergula apetala	
 Colobanthus bolivianus Pax
 Colobanthus brevisepalus Kirk
 Colobanthus buchananii Kirk
 Colobanthus caespitosus Colenso
 Colobanthus canaliculatus Kirk
 Colobanthus curtisiae J.G. West
 Colobanthus diffusus Hook. f.
 Colobanthus hookeri Cheeseman	
 Colobanthus kerguelensis Hook. f.

 Colobanthus lycopodoides  Griseb.
 Colobanthus masonae L.B. Moore
 Colobanthus monticola Petrie
 Colobanthus muelleri Kirk = C. billardieri var. brachypoda
 Colobanthus muscoides Hook. f.
 Colobanthus nivicola M. Gray

 Colobanthus pulvinatus F. Muell.
 Colobanthus quitensis (Kunth) Bartl., = C. alatus, C. aretioides, C.  billardieri, C. cherlerioides, C. crassifolius, C. crassifolius var. aretioides, C.  maclovianus, C. meingeni, C. quitensis var. alatus, C. saginoides, Sagina crassifolia, S. quitensis, Spergula affinis?
 Colobanthus repens Colenso
 Colobanthus squarrosus Cheeseman
 Colobanthus strictus (Cheeseman) Cheeseman
 Colobanthus subulatus (d'Urv.) Hook. f.
 Colobanthus wallii Petrie

References

 
Caryophyllaceae genera